The Xifeng Temple is a Buddhist temple in Beijing, China.  Although established during the Tang dynasty, the present temple date to 1436 during the Ming dynasty.

Notes

Buddhist temples in Beijing